Megascolia procer, the giant scoliid wasp, is a solitary wasp in the family Scoliidae  found across the Oriental region. It is one of the largest wasps in the world, with a wingspan of 11.6 cm.

Description 

The body is primarily black with yellowish markings on the front and vertex of the head, pronotum, scutellum, metanotum, medial spot on the first gastral tergite, and a pair of anterolateral spots on the third gastal tergite. The wings are brown with blue iridescent reflections. This structural coloration is because the wing is made of chitin, made dark with melanin, and covered with a transparent overlayer 286 nm thick that acts as an interference thin film.

Distribution 
The nominate subspecies has a broad range across the continent of Asia, including records in Indonesia, Malaysia, Singapore, Malaya, Thailand, Myanmar, and India. There are also subspecies found in Sumatra, Java, and Borneo.

Life cycle 

The species is a parasitoid of the scarabaeid Atlas beetle, Chalcosoma atlas. The wasp paralyzes a beetle grub with its sting, then lays an egg on it and buries it in an underground cell. When the wasp larva hatches, it consumes its still-living host before pupating inside its remains.

Subspecies 
There are four subspecies of M. procer:

 Megascolia procer procer (Illiger, 1802)
 Megascolia procer bimaculata (Gribodo, 1893)
 Megascolia procer javanensis Betrem, 1964
 Megascolia procer nigriventris (Mantero, 1903)

See also 
 List of largest insects

References 

Scoliidae
Hymenoptera of Asia
Insects of Indonesia
Insects of Java
Insects of Borneo

Insects described in 1802